Frank London Brown (October 7, 1927 – March 12, 1962) was an American author, journalist, and activist.  His writings include two novels, Trumbull Park (1959) and The Myth Maker (posthumous publication, 1969), recognized as contributions in literary realism and literary existentialism.  A part of the Chicago Black Renaissance, his novels portrayed African-American experiences in Chicago and urban America.

Life
Frank London Brown was born in Kansas City, Missouri, and moved with his family to Chicago at aged 12.  He graduated from DuSable High School and for a short time attended Wilberforce University. Brown enlisted in the U.S. Army, and served as a singer in an Army band.  He graduated with a bachelor's degree from Roosevelt University, and went onto graduate school at the University of Chicago where he became part of the Committee on Social Thought, earning a master's degree and working toward a PhD. While attending school and pursuing his writing, he worked various jobs, including as a union organizer for the United Packinghouse Workers of America.

Brown was a prolific journalist, writing for the Chicago Defender, Chicago Review, Chicago Sun-Times, Chicago Tribune, Ebony, Negro Digest, and other periodicals.  His coverage of the Emmett Till murder became especially well known. A devotee of jazz and blues music (in which genres he sometimes performed as a club vocalist) he wrote a seminal article on Thelonious Monk for DownBeat magazine.

Brown was diagnosed with leukemia in 1961 and died the following year.

Work 
 Trumbull Park. A novel. Regnery, Chicago 1959; Northeastern University Press, Boston, Mass. 2005, ISBN 9781555536282.
 Short stories. 2. Auflage. Frank London Brown Historical Association, Chicago 1969.
 The myth maker. A novel. Path Press, Chicago 1969.

In anthologies 
 Ulli Beier (Hrsg.): Black Orpheus. An anthology of new African and Afro-American stories. 1. Auflage. McGraw-Hill Book Company, New York 1965.
 Langston Hughes (Hrsg.): The best short stories by Negro writers. An anthology from 1899 to the present. 1. Auflage. Little, Brown and Company, Boston 1967.
 Wayne Charles Miller (Hrsg.): A gathering of ghetto writers: Irish, Italian, Jewish, Black, and Puerto Rican. New York University Press, New York 1972, ISBN 9780814753583.
 John Henrik Clarke (Hrsg.): Black American short stories. One hundred years of the best. Hill and Wang, New York 1993.
 Sascha Feinstein und David Rife (Hrsg.): The jazz fiction anthology. Indiana University Press, Bloomington 2009, ISBN 0253221374.

References

1927 births
1962 deaths
20th-century American novelists
African-American novelists
American activist journalists
Writers from Chicago